This is a list of the named shear zones affecting the rocks of Great Britain and the Isle of Man. See the main article on shear for a fuller treatment of shear in rocks.

Key to tables

Column 1 indicates the name of the shear zone. Note that different authors may use different names for the same shear zone or a section of it.
Column 2 indicates the OS grid reference of the approximate midpoint of certain shear zones. Note that the mapped extent of a shear zone may not accurately reflect its actual extent.
Column 3 indicates the country in which the shear zone occurs.
Column 4 indicates the county in which the shear zone occurs. Some traverse two or more counties of course.
Column 5 indicates on which sheet, if any, of the British Geological Survey's 1:50,000 / 1" scale geological map series of England and Wales (E&W) or of Scotland (Sc), the shear zone is shown and named (either on map/s or cross-section/s or both). A handful of BGS maps at other scales are listed too.
Column 6 indicates a selection of publications in which references to the shear zone may be found. See references section for full details of publication.

Tabulated list of shear zones

References

See also
 List of geological faults of Scotland
 List of geological faults of Wales
 List of geological folds in Great Britain
 Geological structure of Great Britain

Geology of Scotland
Geology of Wales
Shear zones
Structural geology